The Deutscher Musikwettbewerb (German music competition) is a national music competition in Germany for classical soloists and chamber music ensembles held annually by the Deutscher Musikrat (German Music Council). It was first held in 1975 and is considered the most important competition for young musicians in Germany. The instrumental categories vary, and an extra prize is given for compositions. In even years the competition takes place in Bonn, where the Musikrat is based, and in the other years in a different German town.

Award winners not only receive monetary awards but also long-term sponsorship and support through the Musikrat, including the opportunity to perform in concerts, record CDs and recommendations to perform with orchestras as soloists.

Recipients (selection) 
 1980 
 Michael Tröster (guitar) 

 2002 
 ensemble amarcord

 2006 
 Nils Mönkemeyer (viola)
 Nicholas Rimmer (piano accompanist)
 Quartet New Generation (recorder quartet)

 2007 
  (percussion)

 2008 
 

 2009 
 Byol Kang (violin)
  (accompanist) 

 2011 
 Miao Huang (piano)
 Lars Karlin (trombone)
 Trombone Unit Hannover (trombone octett)
 , Benjamin Scheuer (composition)

 2012 
 Tobias Feldmann (violin)
 Rie Koyama (bassoon)
 Koryun Asatryan, Asya Fateyeva (saxophone)
 Duo Gerassimez (duo cello/piano)
 Daniel Moreira, Sascha Thiele (composition)

 2013 
 Jonas Palm, Janina Ruh (cello)
 Rubén Durá de Lamo (tuba)
 Sabrina Ma (percussion)
 , Kathrin Denner (composition)

 2014 
  (piano)

 2015 
 Wies de Boevé (double bass)
 Bettina Aust (clarinet)
 Damian Scholl (composition) 

 2016 
 Katharina Konradi (soprano)
 Raphaela Gromes, Valentino Worlitzsch (cello)
 Simon Höfele (trumpet)
 Constantin Hartwig (tuba)
 Tobias Klich, Tamon Yashima (composition) 

 2017 
 Tillmann Höfs (French horn)
 Juri Schmahl (oboe)
 Elias Jurgschat, Steven Heelein (composition) 

 2018 
 Ioana Cristina Goicea (violin)
 Theo Plath (bassoon)
 Maciej Frąckiewicz (accordion) 
 Eliot Quartett (string quartet)
 Francesco Ciurlo, Ling-Hsuan Huang (composition) 

 2019 
 Konstantin Krimmel (baritone)
 Sebastian Fritsch (cello)
 Friedrich Thiele (cello) 

 2021 
 Max Volbers (recorder)
 Trio E.T.A. (piano trio)
 Trio Klangspektrum, Ensemble für Neue Musik
 Martín Donoso Vera (composition)
 Alireza Khiabani (composition)

References

External links 
 
 Recipients since 1975

Music competitions in Germany